Simone Salviato (born 12 July 1987) is an Italian professional football player. He plays for Treviso.

Career
He made his Serie B debut on 25 October 2008 whilst playing for Mantova, in a 3–1 defeat at home to Parma.

Following Mantova's bankruptcy and subsequent demotion to Serie D, Salviato joined Livorno on 11 July 2010.

He was subsequently signed by Novara in July 2013, and loaned out to Pescara in January 2014. He joined Serie B club, Bari, during the summer 2014 transfer market. In January 2016 he moved to Virtus Lanciano; in the summer of that year he accords with Cremonese. On 3 January 2018, he joined Padova on an undisclosed fee.

On 31 January 2019, he signed with Vicenza Virtus.

On 5 September 2019, he joined Serie D club Luparense.

On 2 July 2021 he moved to Treviso in Eccellenza.

References

External links
 Player Profile from livornocalcio.it
 Player Profile from legaserieb.it

1987 births
Sportspeople from Padua
Living people
Italian footballers
Association football defenders
Rovigo Calcio players
Mantova 1911 players
U.S. Livorno 1915 players
Novara F.C. players
Delfino Pescara 1936 players
S.S.C. Bari players
S.S. Virtus Lanciano 1924 players
U.S. Cremonese players
Calcio Padova players
L.R. Vicenza players
A.C. Trento 1921 players
Treviso F.B.C. 1993 players
Serie B players
Serie C players
Serie D players
Footballers from Veneto